Sodalia is a genus of skippers in the family Hesperiidae.

Species
Recognised species in the genus Sodalia include:
 Sodalia argyrospila (Mabille, 1876)
 Sodalia coler (Schaus, 1902)
 Sodalia petiti Gaviria-Ortiz, Dolibaina & Warren in Gaviria-Ortiz et al., 2020
 Sodalia sodalis (Butler, 1877)

References

Natural History Museum Lepidoptera genus database

Hesperiinae
Hesperiidae genera